The Matlacha Pass Bridge (pronounced "Mat-La-Shay") is a small single-leaf drawbridge located in Matlacha, Florida.  It carries County Road 78 (Pine Island Road) over Matlacha Pass, connecting Pine Island with the mainland in Cape Coral.

The first bridge spanning Matlacha Pass was a small wooden swing bridge.  The first bridge's swing span was a recycled span that had previously been used on the Alva Bridge.  The first bridge was built largely in part to the influence of Pine Island resident Harry Stringfellow, who served as a county commissioner from 1926 to 1953.

The first bridge was replaced with a concrete bascule bridge in 1968.  The bridge became a very popular fishing spot for local residents, and was nicknamed "The fishingest bridge in the world".  The current bascule bridge opened on November 18, 2012.  The current span is 9 feet tall, similar to its predecessor.

After its demolition, the previous bridge (the one built in 1968) was made into an artificial reef at Novak's reef, which is about 3 miles off the coast of Charlotte County.

The third bridge was destroyed by storm surge from Hurricane Ian in late September 2022. A temporary bridge has since been built in its place by early October of that year.

References 

Bridges completed in 1927
Bascule bridges in the United States
Road bridges in Florida
1927 establishments in Florida
Concrete bridges in the United States
Bridges in Lee County, Florida
Pine Island (Lee County, Florida)